Mary Magdalene is an oil on canvas painting by Belgian painter Alfred Stevens. It is Stevens' revision of the Biblical figure of Mary Magdalene. The work has been in the collection of the Museum of Fine Arts in Ghent since 2001.

The painting was ordered by the Parisian merchant Georges Petit.

Painting
Alfred Stevens, painter of the mundane life in Paris, met the actress Sarah Bernhardt around 1887. He made several portraits of her. In some of them she posed as a character from history or literature. In this painting we see Bernhardt as Mary Magdalene, the gospel courtesan who later converted and retired as a recluse.

The long hair, the skull - the vanitas symbol par excellence - and the desolate landscape in the background are part of an iconographic tradition that goes back to the Middle Ages. Typical of the nineteenth century is the manifest sensuality and the melancholic, almost hallucinatory gaze wherewith Mary Magdalene looks at the viewer. This blurs the religious context of the character. 

The challenging character of the work, yet completely in keeping with the figure of Mary Magdalene, shocked the general public who preferred to see her portrayed as the repentant penitent.

References

Sources
 
 
 
 Saskia de Bodt and others: Alfred Stevens. Brussels – Paris 1823-1906 . Royal Museums of Fine Arts of Belgium, Van Gogh Museum / Mercator Fund, 2009. 
 Guido Kindt Sancta Erotica, How the Church Used Mary Magdalene . Van Halewyck, Leuven, 2002.

External links
 'Maria Magdalena' op website MSK Gent.
 Verschuivingen in de beeldvorming van Maria Magdalena.
 Artikel over Stevens' 'Maria Magdalena'. 

1887 paintings
1880s paintings
Paintings in the collection of the Museum of Fine Arts, Ghent
Paintings by Alfred Stevens
Mary Magdalene in art
Paintings depicting Mary Magdalene